William H. Bailey (born December 4, 1962) is an American politician. He is a member of the South Carolina House of Representatives from the 104th District, serving since 2018. He is a member of the Republican party.

In 2021, Bailey announced a campaign for the South Carolina 7th district in Congress against Tom Rice. Rice is facing opposition in the Republican primary because of his vote to impeach former President Donald Trump.

Electoral history

References

Living people
1962 births
Republican Party members of the South Carolina House of Representatives
21st-century American politicians
Coastal Carolina University alumni
Webster University alumni